Minas or MINAS may refer to:

People with the given name Minas
 Menas of Ethiopia (died 1563)
 Saint Menas (Minas, 285–309)
 Minias of Florence (Minas, Miniato, died 250)
 Minas Alozidis (born 1984), Greek hurdler
 Minas Avetisyan (1928–1975)
 Minas Hantzidis (born 1966), Greek footballer
 Minas Hadjimichael (born 1956), Permanent Representative to the United Nations for Cyprus
 Minas Hatzisavvas (1948–2015), Greek actor
 Minas of Aksum, 6th-century bishop

People with the surname Minas 

 Iskouhi Minas (1884–1951), French poet and writer of Armenian descent.

Places
 Minas Gerais, Brazil
 Minas, Uruguay
 Minas Department, Córdoba, Argentina
 Minas Department, Neuquén, Argentina
 Minas, Cuba, a municipality in Cuba
 Minas, Iran, a village in West Azerbaijan Province, Iran
 Minas Basin in Nova Scotia
 Les Mines, a former Acadian community on the shores of the Minas Basin (called Minas or Mines in English)

Other uses
 Mina (unit),  an ancient Near Eastern unit of weight, and hence, also unit of currency
 Minas (band), an American bossa nova band
 Minas cheese
 Minas Tênis Clube, a social and sports club from Belo Horizonte, Brazil
 MINAS, a biochemistry database
 Minas, a Cablebús station in Mexico City
 Mina (Sikhism), a sect of Sikhism
 Minas Tirith, fictional city in Lord of the Rings

See also
 
 Mina (disambiguation)